Hiltons is an unincorporated community in Scott County, Virginia, United States. It is part of the Kingsport–Bristol (TN)–Bristol (VA) Metropolitan Statistical Area, which is a component of the Johnson City–Kingsport–Bristol, TN-VA Combined Statistical Area – commonly known as the "Tri-Cities" region.

History
The Fulkerson-Hilton House was listed on the National Register of Historic Places in 2002.

Geography

Hiltons is located at  (36.65485, -82.46777).  The community is situated along US highway 421 (Virginia route 58) in the Poor Valley region of Virginia, bounded on the north by Clinch Mountain and the south by Pine Ridge.  The area is most noted as being a waypoint on the route to Maces Spring, home to the Carter Family Fold, which lies three miles to the east.

References

External links
 Scott County (VA) website
 Official Carter Family Fold Website
  PBS special on the Carter Family

Unincorporated communities in Scott County, Virginia
Unincorporated communities in Virginia
Kingsport–Bristol metropolitan area